Mercedes Chilla López (born January 19, 1980, in Jerez de la Frontera, Cádiz) is a javelin thrower from Spain. She has represented Spain at two Summer Olympics (2004 and 2008) and has also competed at the World Championships in Athletics. Chilla is the Spanish record holder for the event, with a best mark of 64.07 metres, and has won medals at the Mediterranean Games and the Ibero-American Championships.

Career
She first reached the international podium at the 2003 Summer Universiade, where she took the bronze medal. She attended her first Olympic competition at the 2004 Athens Games and she was 22nd overall. In 2005, she enjoyed success at the regional level with another javelin bronze at the 2005 Mediterranean Games and she improved on her previous global competition performance with a fifteenth-place finish at the 2005 World Championships in Athletics.

Her 2006 season saw her gain a slew of European honours, starting with a bronze at the 2006 European Cup Winter Throwing and another third-place finish at the 2006 European Cup. She completed a trio of bronze medal performances by reaching the podium at the 2006 European Athletics Championships. She capped off a successful season with a personal best and Spanish record throw of 63.20 metres at the Herculis meeting in August 2006.

She suffered a number of injuries between 2008 and 2010, interrupting her international career, but she still managed ninth place at the 2008 Beijing Olympics and eleventh place at the 2009 World Championships in Athletics. She took the javelin gold at the 2010 Ibero-American Championships in Cádiz, nearing her top form with a winning throw of 62.39 m.  Chilla improved her Spanish record the following week, throwing 64.07 m to win at the Liga de Clubes de División de Honor meeting in Valencia, Spain. This mark made her fifth in the world rankings and demonstrated her potential to return to the podium at the 2010 European Athletics Championships.

Achievements

References

External links
 
 

1980 births
Living people
Spanish female javelin throwers
Athletes (track and field) at the 2004 Summer Olympics
Athletes (track and field) at the 2008 Summer Olympics
Olympic athletes of Spain
Sportspeople from Jerez de la Frontera
European Athletics Championships medalists
Universiade medalists in athletics (track and field)
Mediterranean Games bronze medalists for Spain
Mediterranean Games medalists in athletics
Athletes (track and field) at the 2001 Mediterranean Games
Athletes (track and field) at the 2005 Mediterranean Games
Universiade bronze medalists for Spain
Competitors at the 2001 Summer Universiade
Medalists at the 2003 Summer Universiade